Black Forest gâteau or Black Forest cake (American English) is a chocolate sponge cake with a rich cherry filling based on the German dessert , literally "Black Forest Cherry-torte".

Typically, Black Forest gateau consists of several layers of chocolate sponge cake sandwiched with whipped cream and cherries. It is decorated with additional whipped cream, maraschino cherries, and chocolate shavings. In some European traditions, sour cherries are used both between the layers and for decorating the top. Traditionally, kirschwasser, a clear spirit made from sour cherries, is added to the cake. Other spirits are sometimes used, such as rum, which is common in Austrian recipes. German law mandates that any dessert labeled  must have kirschwasser.

History
The dessert is not directly named after the Black Forest mountain range in southwestern Germany.

According to one school of thought, the name is derived from the specialty liquor of that region, known as Schwarzwälder Kirsch(wasser), which is distilled from tart cherries. This is the ingredient that gives the dessert its distinctive cherry pit flavor and alcoholic content flavor. 

Some sources claim that the name of the cake is inspired by the traditional costume of the women of the Black Forest region, with a characteristic hat with big, red pom-poms on top, called Bollenhut.

This claim, however, has never been substantiated. A long time ago, cherries, cream, and Kirschwasser were combined in the form of a dessert in which cooked cherries were served with cream and Kirschwasser, originated in Black forest region famous for its cherry trees.

 was first mentioned in writing in 1934. At the time it was particularly associated with Berlin but was also available from high-class confectioners in other German, Austrian, and Swiss cities. In 1949 it took 13th place in a list of best-known German cakes.

In popular culture

The 2007 video game Portal made frequent references to a fictional Black Forest cake, inspired by a real life  the developers purchased from a nearby café. The commercial success of the game, as well as the popularity of the internet meme regarding the cake, led to the Black Forest cake becoming famous among fans of the franchise.

Records
The record for the world's largest authentic Black Forest gâteau was set at Europa Park, Germany, on 16 July 2006, by K&U Bakery. On 9 December 2012, a team led by chefs Jörg Mink and Julien Bompard made Asia's biggest Black Forest cake at the S-One Expo in Singapore.

A Swedish cake called  is related to the traditional Black Forest gâteau only by name. It consists of layers of meringue containing finely ground roasted hazelnuts covered by a thin layer of chocolate with whipped cream in between. The whole cake is also covered with whipped cream and decorated with thin dark chocolate and cocoa powder.

See also
 List of cakes
 List of cherry dishes
 List of German desserts
 Zuger Kirschtorte

References

External links
 
 

German cakes
Baden cuisine
Chocolate cakes
Foods with alcoholic drinks
Cherry dishes
Black Forest
Sponge cakes
Layer cakes
Chocolate desserts